Box Butte Dam (National ID # NE01069) is a dam in the arid northwestern panhandle area of Dawes County, Nebraska.

The earthen dam was constructed from 1941 through 1946 by the United States Bureau of Reclamation with a structural height of 87 feet and 5508 feet long at its crest.  It impounds the Niobrara River for flood control, part of the Bureau's Mirage Flats Project for irrigation water storage.  No hydroelectric power is produced here.

The reservoir it creates, Box Butte Reservoir, has a water surface of 1600 acres, 612 land surrounding land acres, about 14 miles of shoreline, and a capacity of 31,060 acre-feet.  Recreation includes fishing (for northern pike, walleye, largemouth bass, yellow perch, and channel cat), hunting, boating, camping and hiking.

The southern shore of the lake borders the Box Butte Reservoir State Recreation Area.

References

Dams in Nebraska
Reservoirs in Nebraska
United States Bureau of Reclamation dams
Buildings and structures in Dawes County, Nebraska
Earth-filled dams
Dams completed in 1946
Landforms of Dawes County, Nebraska